Parižlje is a settlement in the Municipality of Braslovče in northern Slovenia. It lies on the right bank of the Savinja River, opposite Polzela. The area is part of the traditional region of Styria. The municipality is now included in the Savinja Statistical Region.

A round roadside chapel-shrine in the settlement dates to 1938.

References

External links
Parižlje on Geopedia

Populated places in the Municipality of Braslovče